The Oakland Athletics' 1991 season was the team's 24th in Oakland, California. It was also the 91st season in franchise history. The team finished fourth in the American League West with a record of 84-78.

The 1991 season saw the Athletics' American League dominance come to an abrupt end. Between 1988 and 1990, the team had won three American League pennants and one World Series title; in the process, they won a combined 306 regular season games. In light of these accomplishments, the Athletics were initially favored to win a fourth consecutive American League pennant.

A fourth consecutive World Series appearance, however, was not to be, marking the 1991 Athletics a failed season. In 1991, poor pitching (from both the starting rotation and the bullpen) served to take the Athletics out of contention. From 1988 to 1990, the Athletics had posted a team earned run average (ERA) of roughly 3.24 (easily the American League's best over that span); in 1991, however, they posted a sickly team ERA of 4.57 (the American League's second-worst). Of particular note were the struggles of ace Dave Stewart, whose 1991 ERA (5.18) was more than twice his 1990 ERA (2.56). 1990 Cy Young Award winner Bob Welch fared almost as poorly; his earned run average swelled from 2.95 (1990) to 4.58 (1991). In 1990, he had won a league-high 27 games; in 1991, he won a mere 12.

The Athletics' 1991 campaign, as such, is remembered mainly for the record-breaking exploits of Rickey Henderson. On May 1, he stole his 938th career base; in doing so, he succeeded Lou Brock as MLB's career stolen base leader. Henderson would end the 1991 season with 994 stolen bases.

Oakland would return to contention in 1992 with a record of 96-66. The 1991 season still, however, marked the end of the Athletics as a dynastic power. The 1992 team failed to dominate the league in the manner that the 1988–90 teams had; following that team's six-game ALCS defeat to the Toronto Blue Jays, Oakland wouldn't reach the postseason until 2000.

Offseason
 December 3, 1990: Willie Wilson was signed as a free agent by the Athletics.
 December 4, 1990: Darren Lewis and a player to be named later were traded by the Athletics to the San Francisco Giants for Ernest Riles. The Athletics completed the deal by sending Pedro Pena (minors) to the Giants on December 17.
 December 19, 1990: Scott Sanderson was signed as a free agent by the Athletics.
 December 20, 1990: Ozzie Canseco was released by the Athletics.
 December 31, 1990: Scott Sanderson was purchased from the Athletics by the New York Yankees.
 January 7, 1991: Vance Law was signed as a free agent by the Athletics.
 January 14, 1991: Webster Garrison was signed as a free agent by the Athletics.
 January 15, 1991: Dave Veres was traded by the Athletics to the Los Angeles Dodgers for Kevin Campbell.
January 16, 1991: Troy Neel was traded by the Cleveland Indians to the Oakland Athletics for Larry Arndt.
February 8, 1991: Tony Batista was signed by the Oakland Athletics as an amateur free agent.

Regular season
On May 15, 1991, President George H.W. Bush attended a baseball game in Baltimore with Her Majesty, Queen Elizabeth II. The two saw the Oakland Athletics play the Baltimore Orioles for two innings.

Opening Day starters
 Harold Baines
 José Canseco
 Mike Gallego
 Dave Henderson
 Rickey Henderson
 Mark McGwire
 Ernest Riles
 Terry Steinbach
 Dave Stewart
 Walt Weiss

Season standings

Record vs. opponents

Notable transactions
 May 18, 1991: Andy Hawkins was signed as a free agent by the Athletics.
 July 26, 1991: Lee Tinsley and Apolinar Garcia (minors) were traded by the Athletics to the Cleveland Indians for Brook Jacoby.
 July 31, 1991: Matt Grott and Russell Cormier (minors) were traded by the Athletics to the Montreal Expos for Ron Darling.
August 5, 1991: Mark Acre was signed by the Oakland Athletics as an amateur free agent.
August 20, 1991: Andy Hawkins was released by the Athletics.

Draft picks
June 3, 1991: Scott Sheldon was drafted by the Oakland Athletics in the 8th round of the 1991 amateur draft. Player signed June 5, 1991.
June 3, 1991: Damon Mashore was drafted by the Oakland Athletics in the 9th round of the 1991 amateur draft. Player signed June 5, 1991.
June 3, 1991: George Williams was drafted by the Oakland Athletics in the 24th round of the 1991 amateur draft. Player signed June 10, 1991.

Roster

Rickey Henderson's stolen base record
On May 1, 1991, Henderson broke one of baseball's most famous records when he stole the 939th base of his career, one more than Lou Brock. However, Henderson's achievement was somewhat overshadowed because Nolan Ryan, at age 44, set a record that same night by throwing a no-hitter against Toronto, the seventh of his career. Two years earlier, Ryan had previously achieved glory at Henderson's expense by making him his 5,000th strikeout victim. Henderson took an odd delight in the occurrence, saying, "If you haven't been struck out by Nolan Ryan, you're nobody."

Rickey's speech (at right) after breaking Lou Brock's all-time steals record sounds like the standard victory/award speech. Henderson thanked God and his mother, as well as the people that helped him in baseball. All that is remembered, however, is the "I am the greatest of all time" quote, which has been taken by many to support the notion that Henderson is selfish and arrogant.  Years later, Henderson revealed that he had gone over his planned remarks ahead of time with Brock, and the Cardinals Hall of Famer "had no problem with it. In fact, he helped me write what I was going to say that day."

Catfish Hunter's number retired

Jim "Catfish" Hunter's number 27 was retired by the Athletics in a pre-game ceremony on June 9, the first in the franchise's 90 years. Inducted into the National Baseball Hall of Fame in Cooperstown in 1987, the right-handed starter won 161 regular season games in ten seasons for the A's, the first three in Kansas City and the last seven in Oakland. He won 20 or more games in each of his last four seasons in Oakland and was 4–0 with one save in seven World Series appearances. Hunter won the Cy Young Award in his final season in Oakland in 1974, as the A's won their third consecutive World Series. His record in the 1974 regular season was 25–12 with 23 complete games; he led the league in wins and earned run average (2.49). Six years earlier in the first season in Oakland in 1968, Hunter threw the first perfect game in franchise history on May 8 at home (and also had three hits and three runs batted in).

Player stats

Batting

Starters by position
Note: Pos = Position; G = Games played; AB = At bats; H = Hits; Avg. = Batting average; HR = Home runs; RBI = Runs batted in

Other batters
Note: G = Games played; AB = At bats; H = Hits; Avg. = Batting average; HR = Home runs; RBI = Runs batted in

Pitching

Starting pitchers
Note: G = Games pitched, IP = Innings pitched; W = Wins, L = Losses; ERA = Earned run average; SO = Strikeouts

Other pitchers
Note: G = Games pitched; IP = Innings pitched; W = Wins; L = Losses; ERA = Earned run average; SO = Strikeouts

Relief pitchers
Note: G = Games pitched; W = Wins; L = Losses; SV = Saves; ERA = Earned run average; SO = Strikeouts

Farm system

LEAGUE CHAMPIONS: AZL Athletics

References

External links
1991 Oakland Athletics team page at Baseball Reference
1991 Oakland Athletics team page at www.baseball-almanac.com

Oakland Athletics seasons
Oak
Oakland